There are at least 11 named mountains in Wibaux County, Montana.
 Baird Butte, el. 
 Beehive, el. 
 Blue Mountain, el. 
 Four Buttes, el. 
 Graveyard Hill, el. 
 Horse Point, el. 
 Jackrabbit Butte, el. 
 Mount McKinley, el. 
 Pine Hill, el. 
 Podolski Butte, el. 
 Red Top Butte, el.

See also
 List of mountains in Montana

Notes

Landforms of Wibaux County, Montana
Wibaux